Ostra or Ostrá or Östra or Oštra may refer to the following places:

Czech Republic
Ostrá (Nymburk District), a village and municipality in Czech Republic

Italy
Ancient Ostra, an ancient Roman city in Italy
Ostra, Marche, a town and commune in Italy
Ostra Vetere, a town and commune in Italy

Romania
Ostra, Suceava, a commune in Romania

Slovakia 
Ostrá (Veľká Fatra), a mountain in Slovakia